This list is sorted by ceremonial county.

Bedfordshire
Bedford Crematorium
The Vale Crematorium, Luton

Berkshire
Easthampstead Park Cemetery and Crematorium, Bracknell
Reading Crematorium
Slough Cemetery and Crematorium
West Berkshire Crematorium, Thatcham

Bristol

Arnos Vale Crematorium (defunct)
Canford Crematorium, Westbury-on-Trym
South Bristol Crematorium, Bedminster Down

Buckinghamshire
Aylesbury Vale Crematorium, Aylesbury
Bierton Crematorium, Aylesbury 
Chilterns Crematorium, Amersham
Crownhill Crematorium, Milton Keynes

Cambridgeshire

Cambridge Crematorium
Fenland Crematorium, March
Peterborough Crematorium, Bretton

Cheshire

Blacon Crematorium and Cemetery, Chester
Crewe Crematorium and Cemetery
Macclesfield Crematorium
Vale Royal Crematorium, Davenham, Northwich
Walton Lea Crematorium, Warrington
Widnes Crematorium

Cornwall
Glynn Valley Crematorium, Bodmin
Penmount Crematorium, Truro
Treswithian Down Crematorium, Camborne

Cumbria
Beetham Hall Crematorium, Kendal
Carlisle Crematorium
Distington Hall Crematorium, Workington
Eden Valley Crematorium, Penrith
Thorncliffe Crematorium, Barrow-in-Furness

Derbyshire
Amber Valley Crematorium, Matlock
Bretby Crematorium, Burton-on-Trent
Brimington Crematorium, Chesterfield
Heanor Crematorium
Markeaton Crematorium, Derby
Trent Valley Crematorium, Aston-on-Trent, Derby

Devon

East Devon Crematorium, Whimple
Efford Cemetery and Crematorium, Plymouth
Exeter and Devon Crematorium, Exeter
North Devon Crematorium, Barnstaple
Torbay Cemetery and Crematorium, Torquay

Dorset

Bournemouth Crematorium
Harbour View Crematorium, Lytchett Minster
Poole Crematorium
Weymouth Crematorium

Durham
Darlington Crematorium
Durham Crematorium
Hartlepool Crematorium, Stranton Grange Cemetery, Hartlepool
Mountsett Crematorium, Stanley
Stockton-On-Tees Crematorium
Wear Valley Crematorium, Bishop Auckland

East Riding of Yorkshire

Chantrelands Crematorium, Kingston-upon-Hull
East Riding Crematorium, Driffield
Haltemprice Crematorium
Hedon Road Crematorium, Kingston-upon-Hull (defunct)
Lelley Fields Crematorium, Preston

East Sussex
Downs Crematorium, Brighton
Eastbourne Crematorium
Hastings Crematorium
Woodvale Crematorium, Brighton

Essex
Basildon Crematorium
Benfleet Crematorium
Bentley Crematorium and Cemetery, Brentwood
Cam Valley Crematorium, Saffron Walden
Chelmsford Crematorium
Colchester Crematorium
Great Chesterford Crematorium
Harlow Crematorium
Harwich Crematorium
Southend Crematorium
Three Counties Crematorium, Braintree

Gloucestershire

Cheltenham Crematorium
Forest of Dean Crematorium, Lydney
Gloucester Crematorium
Westerleigh Crematorium

Greater London
Beckenham Crematorium and Cemetery
Breakspear Crematorium, Ruislip
City of London Cemetery and Crematorium
Croydon Crematorium (located inside Mitcham Road Cemetery)
East Finchley Cemetery and Crematorium
East London Cemetery and Crematorium
Eltham Crematorium
Enfield Crematorium
Forest Park Cemetery and Crematorium, Hainault
Golders Green Crematorium
Hendon Crematorium
Honor Oak Crematorium, Camberwell
Kingston Upon Thames Crematorium
Lewisham Crematorium, Hither Green
Mortlake Crematorium
New Southgate Cemetery and Crematorium
North East Surrey Crematorium, Morden
Putney Vale Cemetery and Crematorium
South West Middlesex Crematorium, Hanworth
South London Crematorium
Upminster Crematorium
West London Crematorium, Kensal Green
West Norwood Cemetery and Crematorium

Greater Manchester

Bolton Crematorium
Blackley Crematorium
Dukinfield Crematorium
Dunham Crematorium, Altrincham
East Lancashire Crematorium, Radcliffe
Howe Bridge Crematorium, Atherton
Manchester Crematorium
Middleton Crematorium, Manchester
Oldham Crematorium
Rochdale Crematorium
Salford Crematorium
Stockport Crematorium
Wigan Crematorium

Hampshire
Basingstoke Crematorium
Charlton Park Crematorium, Andover
New Forest Crematorium, New Milton
The Oaks Crematorium, Havant
Park Crematorium, Aldershot
Portchester Crematorium
South Stoneham Crematorium, Southampton (defunct)
Southampton Crematorium
Test Valley Crematorium, near Romsey
Wessex Vale Crematorium, Hedge End, Eastleigh

Herefordshire
Hereford Crematorium and Cemetery

Hertfordshire
Harwood Park Crematorium, Stevenage
Hemel Hempstead Crematorium
North Hertfordshire Crematorium, Hitchin
West Hertfordshire Crematorium, Garston, Watford
Woollensbrook Cemetery and Crematorium, Hoddesdon

Isle of Man
Douglas Crematorium

Isle of Wight
Isle of Wight Crematorium, Whippingham

Kent
Barham Crematorium, Canterbury
Charing Crematorium, near Ashford
Garden of England Crematorium, Sittingbourne
Hawkinge Cemetery and Crematorium, Folkestone
Kent and Sussex Crematorium and Cemetery, Tunbridge Wells
Medway Crematorium, Rochester
Thamesview Crematorium, Gravesend
Thanet Crematorium, Margate
Vinter Park Crematorium, Maidstone

Lancashire

Accrington Crematorium
Burnley Crematorium
Bury Crematorium
Carleton Crematorium and Cemetery, Blackpool
Charnock Richard Crematorium, Chorley
Lancaster and Morecambe Crematorium, Lancaster
Lytham Crematorium
Pleasington Crematorium, Blackburn
Preston Crematorium
West Lancashire Cemetery and Crematorium, Burscough, Ormskirk

Leicestershire
Gilrose Crematorium, Leicester
Great Glen Crematorium, Leicester
Loughborough Crematorium

Lincolnshire

Alford Crematorium
Boston Crematorium
Grantham Crematorium
Grimsby Crematorium
Lea Fields Crematorium, Lea, near Gainsborough
Lincoln Crematorium
South Lincolnshire Crematorium, Surfleet, near Spalding
Woodlands Crematorium, Scunthorpe

Merseyside
Anfield Crematorium, Liverpool
Bebington Crematorium
Landican Cemetery and Crematorium, Birkenhead
St Helen's Crematorium
Southport Crematorium
Springwood Crematorium, Liverpool
Thornton Crematorium, Crosby
Wallasey Crematorium

Norfolk

Breckland Crematorium, Norwich
Cromer Crematorium
Earlham Crematorium, Norwich
Great Yarmouth Crematorium, Gorleston-on-Sea
Horsham St Faith Crematorium, Norwich
Kings Lynn Crematorium

Northamptonshire
Counties Crematorium, Northampton
Nene Valley Crematorium, Wellingborough
Warren Hill Crematorium, Kettering

Northumberland
Blyth Valley and Wansbeck Crematorium, Blyth

North Yorkshire

Kirkleatham Crematorium, Yearby
Middlesbrough Crematorium
Stonefall Crematorium, Harrogate
Woodlands Crematorium, Scarborough
York Crematorium

Nottinghamshire
Babworth Crematorium, Retford
Barnby Moor Crematorium, Retford
Bramcote Crematorium, Nottingham
Gedling Crematorium, Nottingham
Mansfield Crematorium
Sherwood Forest Crematorium, New Ollerton
Wilford Hill Cemetery and Crematorium, Nottingham

Oxfordshire
Banbury Crematorium
Headington Crematorium, Oxford
North Oxfordshire Crematorium and Memorial Park, Tackley, near Kidlington
South Oxfordshire Crematorium and Memorial Park, Garford, near Abingdon

Shropshire

Emstrey Crematorium and Cemetery, Shrewsbury
Telford Crematorium

Somerset
Haycombe Crematorium, Bath
Mendip Crematorium, Wells
Sedgemoor Crematorium, Bridgwater
Taunton Deane Crematorium
Weston Super Mare Crematorium
Yeovil Crematorium

South Yorkshire

Barnsley Crematorium
Doncaster Crematorium
Grenoside Crematorium, Sheffield
Hutcliffe Wood Crematorium, Sheffield
Rotherham Crematorium
Sheffield Crematorium, City Road Cemetery, Sheffield

Staffordshire
Bradwell Crematorium, Newcastle-under-Lyme
Carmountside Crematorium, Stoke-on-Trent
Lichfield and District Crematorium, Fradley, near Lichfield
Stafford Crematorium

Suffolk
Ipswich Crematorium
Seven Hills Crematorium, Nacton, Ipswich
Waveney Crematorium, Beccles
West Suffolk Crematorium, Bury St Edmunds

Surrey

Guildford Crematorium
Randalls Park Crematorium, Leatherhead
Woking Crematorium

Tyne and Wear
Birtley Crematorium, Chester-le-Street
Saltwell Crematorium, Gateshead
South Tyneside Crematorium, South Shields
Sunderland Crematorium
Tynemouth Crematorium, North Shields
West Road Crematorium, Newcastle upon Tyne

Warwickshire
Heart of England Crematorium, Nuneaton
Oakley Wood Crematorium, near Leamington Spa
Rugby and Daventry Crematorium, Rainsbrook, Rugby
Woodlands Crematorium, Coleshill

West Midlands
Birmingham Crematorium, Perry Barr
Bushbury Cemetery and Crematorium, Wolverhampton
Canley Cemetery and Crematorium, Coventry
Gornal Wood Cemetery and Crematorium, Brierley Hill
Lodge Hill Crematorium, Birmingham
Powke Lane Crematorium, Rowley Regis
Robin Hood Cemetery and Crematorium, Solihull
Rycroft Crematorium, Walsall (defunct)
Sandwell Valley Crematorium, West Bromwich
Stourbridge Crematorium
Streetly Crematorium, Walsall
Sutton Coldfield Crematorium
Yardley Crematorium, Birmingham

West Sussex

Chichester Crematorium
Surrey and Sussex Crematorium, Crawley
Worthing Crematorium

West Yorkshire

Cottingley Crematorium, Leeds
Crigglestone Crematorium, Wakefield
Dewsbury Moor Crematorium, Dewsbury
Halifax Crematorium
Huddersfield Crematorium
Lawnswood Crematorium, Leeds
Manningham Crematorium, Bradford
Nab Wood Crematorium, Shipley
Scholemoor Crematorium, Bradford
Oakworth Crematorium, Keighley
Pontefract Crematorium
Rawdon Crematorium, Leeds

Wiltshire
Kingsdown Crematorium, Swindon
North Wiltshire Crematorium, Royal Wootton Bassett
Salisbury Crematorium
West Wiltshire Crematorium, Semington, near Trowbridge

Worcestershire
Redditch Crematorium
Vale Crematorium, Pershore
Worcester Crematorium
Wyre Forest Crematorium, Stourport-on-Severn

References